Sri Lankan national cricket team toured Zimbabwe from October to November 2016. The tour was originally scheduled to consist of a two Test matches, three One Day Internationals (ODIs) and a single Twenty20 international (T20I), but in September 2016 the one-day matches were replaced by a triangular series featuring Zimbabwe, Sri Lanka and the West Indies and that the tour of Zimbabwe would be reduced to just the two Test matches. Sri Lanka won the series 2–0.

Sri Lanka last played Zimbabwe in a Test match in 2004. The first Test of the series was the 100th Test match played by Zimbabwe. The second Test of the series used the Decision Review System. This was the first time the technology was used in a game in Zimbabwe, having previously been unavailable due to cost.

Squads

Angelo Mathews was ruled out of the tour due to injury and was replaced as captain by Rangana Herath.

Test series

1st Test

2nd Test

References

External links
 Series home at ESPN Cricinfo

2016 in Sri Lankan cricket
2016 in Zimbabwean cricket
Sri Lankan cricket tours of Zimbabwe
International cricket competitions in 2016–17